The Apostolic Vicariate of Pucallpa is a Latin Church Apostolic vicariate of the Catholic Church in Peru. It is immediately exempt to the Holy See and not part of any ecclesiastical province.

Its cathedral is Catedral de la Inmaculada Concepción (dedicated to the Immaculate Conception), located in the episcopal see of Pucallpa in Coronel Portillo Province. It is the capital of that of the wider Ucayali region, in Peru's inland Amazon rainforest.

History 
 Established on March 2, 1956, as Apostolic Vicariate (a missionary pre-diocesan jurisdiction type, entitled to a titular bishop) of Pucallpa, on territory split off from the suppressed Vicariate Apostolic of Ucayali (along with two other vicariates: Apostolic Vicariate of San Ramon and Vicariate Apostolic of Requena).

Ordinaries 
 Apostolic Vicars of Pucallpa 
 Joseph Gustave Roland Prévost Godard, P.M.E. (November 11, 1956 – October 23, 1989), Titular Bishop of Ammædara (November 11, 1956 – November 13, 2005); previously Apostolic Prefect of Lindong  (China) (November 28, 1946 – November 11, 1956)
 Juan Luis Martin Buisson, P.M.E. (October 23, 1989 – September 8, 2008), Titular Bishop of Aquæ in Numidia (April 18, 1986 – ...); succeeding as former Coadjutor Vicar Apostolic of Pucallpa (April 18, 1986 – October 23, 1989)
 Gaetano Galbusera Fumagalli, S.D.B. (September 8, 2008 – July 31, 2019), Titular Bishop of Mascula (July 18, 2007 – ...); succeeding as former Coadjutor Vicar Apostolic of Pucallpa (July 18, 2007 – September 8, 2008)

See also
 Immaculate Conception Cathedral, Pucallpa

External links
 GCatholic.org, with titular incumbent biography links
 Catholic Hierarchy 

Apostolic vicariates
Roman Catholic dioceses in Peru
Christian organizations established in 1956
1956 establishments in Peru
Roman Catholic dioceses and prelatures established in the 20th century